The 652d Bombardment Squadron is an inactive United States Air Force unit.  Its last assignment was with VIII Fighter Command, based at Camp Kilmer, New Jersey.  It was inactivated on 19 December 1945.

History

Lineage
 Constituted 652d Bombardment Squadron (Heavy, Weather Reconnaissance) on 17 July 1944
 Activated on 9 August 1944.
 Inactivated on 19 December 1945.
See 352d Tactical Fighter Squadron for post World War II lineage.

Assignments
 25th Bombardment Group (Reconnaissance), 9 August 1944
 1st Air Division, 13 July 1945
 3d Air Division, 25 August 1945
 1st Air Division, 1 September 1945
 3d Air Division, 12 October 1945
 VIII Fighter Command, 1 November-19 December 1945
 Attached to: 325th Reconnaissance Wing, 6 January-12 October 1945

Stations
 RAF Watton, England, 9 August 1944
 RAF Alconbury, England, 13 July 1945
 RAF Raydon, England, 25 October– December 1945
 Camp Kilmer, New Jersey, C. 17–19 December 1945.

Aircraft
 B-24 Liberator, 1944
 B-17 Flying Fortress, 1944¬1945.

Operations
Weather reconnaissance in ETO, 10 August 1944 – 26 September 1945.

References

 325th Air Division, Reconnaissance AFRHA Fact Sheet

External links

Bombardment squadrons of the United States Army Air Forces
Military units and formations established in 1944